Argynnis childreni, the large silverstripe, is a species of nymphalid butterfly. It was first described by George Robert Gray in 1831. Also known as the Himalayan fritillary, it is found in mountainous areas, from northeastern India into China. The forewings are predominantly orange with black spots, while the hindwings are brown with a blue margin, with many white stripes.

References

Argynnis
Butterflies of Asia
Butterflies described in 1831
Taxa named by George Robert Gray
Butterflies of Indochina